Entropy is a monthly open access scientific journal covering research on all aspects of entropy and information theory. It was established in 1999 and is published by MDPI. The journal occasionally publishes special issues compiled by guest editors. The editor-in-chief is Kevin H. Knuth (University at Albany, SUNY).

Sections

Entropy consists of eight sections:
	
Thermodynamics Section 
Statistical Mechanics
Information Theory
Quantum Information
Complexity
Astrophysics and Cosmology
Entropy Reviews
Entropy and Biology

Abstracting and indexing
The journal is abstracted and indexed in:

According to the Journal Citation Reports, the journal has a 2021 impact factor of 2.738.

2013 Paper on glyphosate
In 2013, Entropy published a review paper saying glyphosate may be the most important factor in the development of obesity, depression, attention deficit hyperactivity disorder, autism, Alzheimer's disease, Parkinson's disease, multiple sclerosis, cancer, and infertility. The paper does not contain any primary research results. It was criticized as pseudo-science by the science magazine Discover and Jeffrey Beall, founder of Beall's List of predatory open-access publishers, said "Will MDPI publish anything for money?". Beall removed MDPI from his list of predatory publishers in October 2015.

In response to the controversy, the editors of Entropy added an "Expression of Concern" to the article's frontmatter. In 2017 researchers Robin Mesnage and Michael N. Antoniou, both of whom are working to limit the use of glyphosate, said that "although evidence exists that glyphosate-based herbicides are toxic below regulatory set safety limits, the arguments of [authors] Samsel and Seneff largely serve to distract rather than to give a rational direction."

References

External links

Physics journals
Chemistry journals
Open access journals
MDPI academic journals
Monthly journals
English-language journals
Publications established in 1999